Pythium scleroteichum is a plant pathogen infecting sweet potatoes.

References

External links
 Index Fungorum
 USDA ARS Fungal Database

Water mould plant pathogens and diseases
Root vegetable diseases
scleroteichum